The She Wolf is a 1919 American short silent Western film starring Texas Guinan and directed by Clifford Smith.

Plot
As described in a film magazine, The She Wolf (Guinan) walks into The Last Hope saloon and discovers its Chinese owner Mui Fing (Wing) and the sheriff (Richardson) cheating a Stranger (Chesebro) in a card game. Drawing her gun, she joins in the game, and in the fight that follows the Stranger is wounded. She takes him back to her shack and tends to him. Several days later the sheriff, who heads a band of outlaws, robs a mail coach and leaves some letters scattered on the road. The She Wolf picks one up and finds that it was written by Sallie Bigby (Wild) to her sweetheart John Williams. The letter says that Sallie's father is in the power of the Chinese saloon owner and that she will be compelled to marry him unless she is rescued. The She Wolf returns to the saloon and starts a second fight, and carries off Sallie to her cabin. Matters are then resolved when Sallie and her sweetheart meet and the Stranger letting it be known that he intends to marry the woman who nursed him back to health.

Cast
 Texas Guinan as The She Wolf
 George Chesebro as The Stranger
 Ah Wing as Mui Fing
 Charles Robertson as Dud Bigby
 Anna Wild as Sallie Bigby
 Jack Richardson as Sheriff of Mad Dog
 Josie Sedgwick as Belle of the Dance Hall

References

External links

 

1919 films
1919 Western (genre) films
1919 short films
American silent short films
American black-and-white films
Silent American Western (genre) films
Films directed by Clifford Smith
1910s American films
1910s English-language films